Ivan Ondruška (born 12 September 1967) is a former Slovak football goalkeeper who recently played for the Slovak 2. liga club MŠK Rimavská Sobota. He played for Sparta Prague in the Gambrinus liga in 1996.

External links
at fcnitra.sk

References

1967 births
Living people
Slovak footballers
Association football goalkeepers
MFK Topvar Topoľčany players
FC Nitra players
FK Dukla Banská Bystrica players
Czech First League players
AC Sparta Prague players
FC VSS Košice players
Slovak Super Liga players
FC Admira Wacker Mödling players
FC ViOn Zlaté Moravce players
Expatriate footballers in Austria
Austrian Football Bundesliga players
Slovak expatriate footballers